Gilpin County Undivided High School is located on Highway 119 in Black Hawk, Colorado, United States. It is a K–12 school and the only public school in Gilpin County School District RE-1.

References

Public high schools in Colorado
Schools in Gilpin County, Colorado
Public elementary schools in Colorado
Public middle schools in Colorado